The Century Series is a popular name for a group of US fighter aircraft representing models designated between F-100 and F-106 which went into full production. They included the first successful supersonic aircraft designs in the United States Air Force's service, which remained in active service well into the 1970s and 1980s with the Air Force Reserve and Air National Guard.  Three later variants, the QF-100, QF-102 and QF-106, also continued in service, primarily as aerial target drones, until the late 1990s. The F-104G stayed in service with the Italian military until 2004. The NASA airborne science program maintains a group of F-104G in airworthy condition for use as test platforms and chase aircraft.

Century Series aircraft
The name "Century Series" stems from the fighter (F-) designation number being in the 100–109 range. The term became popular to refer to a group of generally similar designs of the 1950s and early 1960s.

As it evolved, the attribution of the Century Series moniker reflects models designated between F-100 and F-106 which went into full production:
 North American F-100 Super Sabre
 McDonnell F-101 Voodoo
 Convair F-102 Delta Dagger
 Lockheed F-104 Starfighter
 Republic F-105 Thunderchief
 Convair F-106 Delta Dart

The term "Century Series" does not include less successful models between the F-100 and F-109 that did not go past design or prototype stage: the Republic XF-103 and North American XF-108 Rapier interceptor concepts, the North American F-107 tactical fighter prototype (cancelled in favor of the F-105), and designation "F-109" which was originally assigned to the F-101B Voodoo and later requested but not granted for the Bell XF-109 VTOL concept.

The F- series number sequence used in USAF was a continuation of the pre-USAF pursuit aircraft (P- series) numbering, stretching back as far as to the 1920s. The numbering would continue sequentially up to the General Dynamics F-111, and after this number the 1962 United States Tri-Service aircraft designation system restarted the numbering  back from 1. The McDonnell Douglas F-4 Phantom II fighter-bomber was briefly known as the F-110 Spectre. The USAF continued the naming convention with the Constant Peg program as an operations security measure. The last known aircraft with a F-1xx designation is the Lockheed F-117 Nighthawk stealth attack aircraft, which is unrelated to other F-1xx aircraft but received the designation as an additional layer of obscuration for this highly secretive program.

Characteristics
The Century Series aircraft represented a mix of fighter-bombers (F-100, F-101A, F-105) and pure interceptors (F-101B, F-102, F-104, F-106).

The unifying characteristic of the Century Series aircraft was advanced performance and avionics when they were introduced. The F-100 was the first aircraft in the USAF capable of exceeding the speed of sound in level flight. The F-101 was the first aircraft in the USAF capable of exceeding 1,000 mph (1,600 km/h). The F-102 was the first aircraft in the world to utilize area rule in its design. The F-104 was the first combat aircraft capable of Mach 2 flight, and the only aircraft in history to simultaneously hold the world speed and altitude records. Three of the Century Series aircraft—F-101, F-102, and F-106—were armed with nuclear air-to-air missiles. These weapons, designed to destroy incoming nuclear-armed Soviet bombers even when not scoring a clear hit (due to the nuclear explosion radius, shock wave and radiation burst), were the only nuclear weapons in USAF arsenal at the time to be under sole control of their pilots (during a mission).

Similar advancements were made in this period by the United States Navy and United States Marine Corps with the Douglas F4D Skyray (later F-6), Vought F8U Crusader and F4H Phantom II carrier-based aircraft, but US Naval Aviation lacked a similar naming group.

See also
 Teen Series
 United States military aircraft designation systems
 List of military aircraft of the United States

References

Notes

Bibliography

 Drendel, Lou. Century Series. 1980. Carrollton, Texas. Squadron/Signal Publications, Inc. 

Fighter aircraft
United States Century series fighters
United States military aircraft